Oides is a genus of leaf beetle with nearly 40 species in the Oriental and Palearctic Realms.

Species in the genus include:

 Oides affinis 
 Oides andrewesi 
 Oides antennata 
 Oides apicalis 
 Oides bezdeki 
 Oides boreri 
 Oides bowringii 
 Oides celebensis 
 Oides coccinelloides 
 Oides cyanella 
 Oides decempunctata 
 Oides dimidiaticornis 
 Oides duodecimpunctata 
 Oides duporti 
 Oides epipleuralis 
 Oides femoralis 
 Oides flava 
 Oides foveicollis 
 Oides geiseri 
 Oides hsui 
 Oides innocua 
 Oides laticlava 
 Oides leucomelaena 
 Oides livida 
 Oides maculata 
 Oides maculosa 
 Oides metallica 
 Oides multimaculata 
 Oides palleata 
 Oides quadriguttata 
 Oides quadrivittata 
 Oides scutellata 
 Oides semipunctata 
 Oides takizawai 
 Oides tarsata 
 Oides thibettana 
 Oides tibiella 
 Oides ustulaticia 
 Oides vexilla 
 Oides wangi

References 

Chrysomelidae genera
Galerucinae